Anthony James is a British/American artist, based in Los Angeles, known for his monumental and experiential sculptures and installations. His work gestures towards the theatricality of minimalism and formalism. There is a focus on materiality, alchemy, and a deep respect for light and space.

Early life

Anthony James was born in England in 1974. He studied in London at Central Saint Martins College of Art and Design and graduated with a degree in fine art painting.

Art

Portals / Platonic] Solids / Archimedean Solids, 2008–present

The sculptures, made of stainless steel, glass, and LED lights, have shown internationally to great acclaim.

Repose, 2020

The series consists of three Ferrari bodies: the 1957 250TR, 1962 250 GTO, and the 1967 P4. The sculptures are presented in archival quality bronze, aluminum, and copper.

KΘ Kalos Thanatos, 2008

James gained international recognition in 2008 for his work Kalos Thanatos (KΘ), Greek for “beautiful death”, when he burned his Ferrari F335 Spyder in a birch forest, and then displayed it in a mirrored glass box with birch tree trunks. James was inspired by the ancient Greeks, who made sacrifices to Aphrodite in birch forests. Glenn O'Brien lauded James's Kalos Thanatos: "I miss art going out on a limb ... Just a slim limb that looks like there’s at least some chance of it snapping ... Anthony James burned his Ferrari and put it in a box, amid, actually, a bunch of limbs. That was going for it ... this work is pretty gutsy".

The Birch Series, 2005–present

James originally debuted The Birch Series in New York City in 2005. It consisted of several variously sized, vertical light boxes with young birch tree trunks inside. The sculpture series references the containment and simulation of nature. The works have mirrored sides, which give the illusion of an endless birch forest. The pieces are composed of birch trees, metal, glass, and fluorescent lights or LEDs. The birch tree is associated with magical symbolism. Of the series, James said, "I think about the containment of nature. The containment of our own nature. There’s something about the individual's journey that is really at the root of it. Going into the forest—not knowing what you’ll find—not knowing if you’ll ever return ... You can see the metaphor."

Morphic Fields, 2014

Morphic Fields was an exhibition of bronze and limestone pieces inspired by the scientist Rupert Sheldrake's pseudoscientific theory of morphic resonance: "a process whereby self-organizing systems inherit a memory from previous similar systems." The sculptures are created from found materials and "through [James's] process of converting ... waste into bronze they morph into something very beautiful and precious."

Shields, 2015–present

Shields was an exhibition of curved disks made of brass, bronze, and steel "scarred with minimalist markings." This series "operates elusively, staggering between the iconic and the arbitrary, the concrete and the alchemic, the mythical and experiential." James describes his work as "evoking pictorial depictions of the cosmos, alluding to notions of mysticism, ethereality, and science fiction, all the while anchored through the use of weighty, industrial materials such as metal." The shields "read as relics or artifacts from some liminal moment, as such, James attempts to locate beauty in the wake of insanity."

Rain Paintings, 2018

A photorealistic series made of contradictory materials: Belgian linen, gesso, and Deltron.

Neons, 2002–present

Colorful rings of neon.

Exhibitions

Selected solo exhibitions
 2020: Opera Gallery, London, England
 2018: Rain Paintings, There-There Gallery, Los Angeles, CA
 2018: Portals, Melissa Morgan Fine Art, Palm Desert CA
 2017: Portals, There-There Gallery, Los Angeles, CA
 2017: Shields, Fort Gansevoor, New York, NY
 2016: Maloney Fine Art, Los Angeles, CA
 2014: Morphic Fields, Walter Storms Galeri, Munich, Germany
 2012: Consciousness And Portraits Of Sacrifice, Brand New Gallery, Milan, Italy
 2010: ΚΘ, Patrick Painter Gallery, Santa Monica, CA
 2007: Visionaire Gallery, New York, NY
 2007: Milk Gallery presented by Gavlak Gallery, New York, NY
 2007: Gavlak Gallery, West Palm Beach, FL
 2006: Kantor/Feuer Window, New York City
 2005: Holasek Wier Gallery, New York City
 1999: Four, Four, Four Apex Art, New York City

Publications

Morphic Fields is the title of a series of 21 amorphous bronze sculptures with limestone bases, which are works created from cardboard boxes dipped in and shaped with wax and subsequently cast in bronze. This first monograph on Anthony James includes writing from fashion and art critic Glenn O'Brien, writer Christian Kracht, and Matthias Mühling, as well as an interview with biologist Rupert Sheldrake, whose pseudoscientific theory of morphic fields inspired the artist’s work and the title of this publication. The book was printed in Germany and published by Hatje Cantz Verlag.

References

External links
 Official website

British sculptors
British male sculptors
21st-century sculptors
Postmodern artists
Living people
1974 births
Alumni of Central Saint Martins